Bray (Daly) Railway Station (Stáisiún Bhré / Uí Dhálaigh in Irish) is a station in Bray in County Wicklow, Ireland. It is located adjacent to Bray seafront and is 600 m from Bray Main Street via Florence Road or Quinsborough Road.

Bray marks the end of the double track line from Dublin and is the end point for most suburban services, with train stabling facilities convenient to the station.

Routes

DART
From the inception of the Dublin Area Rapid Transit (DART) service in 1984 until its extension south to Greystones in 2000, Bray was the southern terminus, with a large number of sidings just south of the station for stabling trains. Although some DARTs now continue southwards to Greystones, the majority still terminate in Bray. Northbound DART services towards Howth and Malahide usually start from Bray, with some originating from Greystones. From Bray southbound the line becomes single track.

Other services
Bray is on the intercity Dublin-Rosslare and commuter Dundalk-Dublin-Arklow-Gorey routes, and all trains on these routes stop here. There are also commuter services that go to Maynooth from Bray stopping at Dún Laoghaire, Blackrock, Sydney Parade and all stations to Maynooth. They often run non-stop between Bray, Dun Laoghaire and Dublin Pearse, and freight and maintenance trains pass through Bray without stopping.

Station building and history
The station was opened on 10 July 1854, following the extension of the railway line south from Dalkey.  The extension of the line around Bray Head to Greystones in 1855 was not accompanied by any additional works at Bray station, so from then until 1928 the station had one through platform serving both southbound through trains and northbound trains to both Harcourt Street, Westland Row (Pearse) and Amiens Street (Connolly). As suburban services from Dublin became more frequent, this made the station extremely difficult to work, even with the provision of a bay platform at the south end for shuttle services to Greystones.

Services to Harcourt Street ceased in 1959 with the closure of the Harcourt Street line.

It was given the name Daly on 10 April 1966, 50 years after the Easter Rising, when Córas Iompair Éireann renamed 15 major stations after Republican leaders. It is named in honour of Edward Daly, a leader in the 1916 Easter Rising.

Between the 1984 inauguration of DART and November 1990, a diesel shuttle train (initially a 201 class or 121 class locomotive with former AEC railcars converted to push–pull stock, later an 80 class train leased from Northern Ireland Railways) operated between Bray and Greystones, connecting with DART services. A similar service using a steam railmotor had operated briefly between 1906 and 1908.

The station houses a bar (closed), shop, coffee stall, ticket office, automated teller machine (ATM) and unheated public toilets. There is a staff room for drivers. Sheltered bicycle parking is located inside the station. Disabled access to platform 2 on the east side of the station is through a new gate on that side, but lifts are also provided on the footbridge. The redevelopment that saw the installation of these lifts were part of Iarnród Éireann's Dart Upgrade project in the early 2000s to improve stations and facilities on the DART line. In addition to the lifts, the distinctive pyramid-style glass roof over platform 2 was renovated, as was the main station building.

The ticket office is open between 07:00–10:00, Monday to Friday.

Platforms
Since it was rebuilt in 1928, the station has two main platforms; platform 1 on the west side of the station near the main entrance, and platform 2 over the footbridge on the east side of the station. Although platform 1 is generally used for northbound services and platform 2 for southbound services and terminating trains, the roles are frequently reversed so as to accommodate as many services as possible. Platform 3, the platform formerly used for the Greystones diesel shuttle, is very seldom used as it has no northbound capacity – it ends directly south of the station building. It is used for cleaning trains and occasionally for DART services to and from Greystones.

Picture series
One of the more distinctive elements of Bray Daly Station is the series of paintings on platform 2. Beginning with a painting of the opening ceremony in 1852, the series runs along the length of the platform, documenting both Irish history and Irish railway history up to the present day. Various carriages, locomotives, and characters can be seen in the pictures, including Oscar Wilde, British soldiers in 1916, James Joyce in the 1940s, a hippy couple in the 1960s, and the introduction of the DART service in 1984. Many of these panels were in need of repair as lime was seeping through the plaster. In 2008 the original artist began a mosaic replacement programme for the mural.

Road transport services
Directly outside the station are bus stops for Dublin Bus, Go-Ahead Ireland and Finnegan Bray routes:

Dublin Bus Routes:

 84 / 84a – Newcastle to Blackrock, via Bray. This route provides a connection to the Luas Green Line terminus at Bride's Glen
 155 – Bray Station to IKEA Dublin, via Dublin city centre

Go-Ahead Ireland routes:

 45a / 45b – Kilmacanogue to Dun Laoghaire, via Bray Station
 184 – Newtownmountkennedy to Bray Station, via Greystones
 185 – Enniskerry to Bray Station

Finnegan Bray routes:

 143 – Southern Cross to Sandyford Luas, via Bray Station
 144 – Southern Cross to Bray Station
 Night Bus from Dublin to Bray / Kilcoole (Thurs, Fri, Sat only)

In addition, a number of bus services stop at Bray Main Street, located 600m from the station.

 Dublin Bus high-frequency route 145 from Ballywaltrim to Heuston Station, via Bray. 
Dublin Bus Nitelink route 84N from Dublin city centre to Greystones, via Bray (Fri & Sat only)
 Bus Eireann route 133 from Wicklow to Dublin Airport, via Bray
 Aircoach route 702 from Greystones to Dublin Airport, via Bray (Castle Street)
 St. Kevin's Bus from Dublin to Glendalough, via Bray

There is also busy taxi rank outside the station, a large car park adjacent to the station, and a pickup lane for collecting passengers by car.

See also

 List of railway stations in Ireland

References

External links

 Bray Daly Station – Official Iarnród Éireann webpage

Buildings and structures in Bray, County Wicklow
Iarnród Éireann stations in County Wicklow
Railway stations in County Wicklow
Railway stations opened in 1854
1854 establishments in Ireland
Railway stations in the Republic of Ireland opened in the 19th century